Formido may refer to:

 Formido (Deimos (deity)), the personification of terror in Roman and Greek mythology
 Formido (game), a video game released by MHGames under the terms of the GNU General Public License (GPL) 
 Formido (store), a Dutch Hardware store-chain